Paul Cooke (born 17 April 1981) is an English former professional rugby league footballer who played in the 1990s, 2000s and 2010s, and rugby league, and rugby union coach of the 2010s.

Background
Cooke was born in East Hull, Humberside.

Career
His pairing with Richard Horne led to the memorable victory over Leeds in the 2005 Challenge Cup Final in which Cooke scored the winning try to give Hull FC a 25–24 victory. Hull FC reached the 2006 Super League Grand final to be contested against St. Helens, and Cooke played  in his side's 4–26 loss.

On 22 July after being given a franchise for Super League from 2009 to 2011 Salford City Reds coach Shaun McRae said he would be interested in speaking to Cooke with an intention of him joining his side, Cooke and McRae worked together at Hull FC earlier in their careers, though Cooke did not go on to play for the Salford City Reds.

On 19 April 2007, BBC Look North (East Yorkshire and Lincolnshire) announced that Cooke was to walk out on Hull F.C. to join cross city rivals Hull Kingston Rovers. Cooke was born in East Hull where Hull Kingston Rovers are based and supported the club as a youngster. He played his last game for Hull F.C. against Bradford that night. The saga was based around Cooke's frustration at being on a lower wage than other established stars at Hull F.C.  Asking the board for a pay rise, the request was denied. With Hull F.C. refusing to increase his pay, Cooke walked out on Hull F.C. and signed with Hull Kingston Rovers.

On 23 April 2007, it was announced that Cooke had signed a three-and-a-half-year deal with Hull Kingston Rovers, taking effect immediately. The Rugby Football League (RFL) initially blocked this transfer stating that his registration remained with Hull FC. Some confusion followed amid allegations that he had never signed his contract with Hull FC, despite local media reports at the time to the contrary. However the move went ahead and he duly turned up playing for Hull Kingston Rovers the following week.

In November 2007, a RFL tribunal found Cooke guilty of misconduct for approaching Hull Kingston Rovers while still under contract to Hull F.C. His punishment included a ban that ruled him out of the first six games of the 2008 season.

Following the tribunal decision Hull F.C. chief executive James Rule said "We will now take time to consider our next steps with regard to potential future civil action" suggesting the Cooke transfer saga may be far from over. However it appears to have died down, and by the end of the 2009 season Cooke had settled into the Hull Kingston Rovers team, making a major contribution to his team's next two Super League finishes of 7th and 4th.

Wakefield Trinity signed Cooke from Hull Kingston Rovers until the end of the 2010–11 season, the 28-year-old /, who made a controversial move from Hull F.C. to Hull Kingston Rovers in 2007, had been out of favour at Hull Kingston Rovers that season. Cooke made his début with Wakefield against Salford on Sunday 21 March 2010, and made his full début in the 36–16 defeat at Warrington, and his first full home game when Wakefield Trinity won 19–6 against neighbours Castleford.

Cooke had the option to earn a deal for next season, whether that was at Wakefield Trinity or another club.
On 12 January 2012 Cooke signed for Championship 1 side Doncaster, after fans and sponsors agreed to pay half his salary. He combined playing for the club with a full-time job in their development department. He also signed as a backs coach for Doncaster Knights, the town's rugby union club, for the 2013/14 season.
Cooke made his début for Featherstone Rovers on Sunday 28 June 2015, and he played his last match for Featherstone during the 2015 season.

References

External links
Leigh Centurions profile
(archived by web.archive.org) Hull Kingston Rovers profile

1981 births
Living people
Doncaster R.L.F.C. coaches
Doncaster R.L.F.C. players
England national rugby league team players
English rugby league coaches
English rugby league players
Featherstone Rovers players
Hull F.C. players
Hull Kingston Rovers players
Rugby league five-eighths
Rugby league locks
Rugby league players from Kingston upon Hull
Wakefield Trinity players